Hawkinsville is a hamlet located east of Boonville, New York on Hawkinsville Road in Oneida County, New York. The Black River flows north through the hamlet.

References

Hamlets in Oneida County, New York
Hamlets in New York (state)